This is a list of yearly standings of independent teams at the highest level of college football from 1956 to 1972, the NCAA University Division. The NCAA University Division was replaced by NCAA Division I in 1973; NCAA Division I football split in 1978, with the higher subdivision named NCAA Division I-A, which was renamed NCAA Division I FBS in 2006.

College independents standings

NCAA University Division

References

Independents
Standings